Piotrkówek may refer to the following places:
Piotrkówek, Łódź Voivodeship (central Poland)
Piotrkówek, Lublin Voivodeship (east Poland)
Piotrkówek, Masovian Voivodeship (east-central Poland)